George Fuller (January 17, 1822 – March 21, 1884) was an American figure and portrait painter.

Biography
Fuller was born in Deerfield, Massachusetts. His father, Aaron Fuller, was a farmer. His mother was Aaron's second wife, Fanny Negus of Petersham, Massachusetts. His parents were not in favor of Fuller becoming a  painter. At age thirteen, he went to Boston, Massachusetts to work for a grocer, then tried selling shoes before giving up on this also and returning home. A year or so later, he went to Illinois with a survey team for the railroad, and continued working with the survey team for a couple of years. Fuller then returned home once again, entered Deerfield Academy, and began to paint in his spare time.

In 1841, his desire to paint overcame his parents' opposition.  He joined his half-brother Augustus as an itinerant painter, and enjoyed some success painting portraits in northern New York. That winter he went to Albany where he studied painting with Henry Kirke Brown for nine months. The next two winters, he studied painting with the Boston Artists' Association, working on the family farm in the summers. In 1846 he sold A Nun at Confession for six dollars. In 1847, he enrolled in the National Academy of Design in New York. He spent most of the next ten years in New York. Some winters he spent in the southern United States painting portraits and scenes about local life. Friends included painter  E.T. Billings, with whom he travelled in the south. In 1857 he was elected an associate of the National Academy of Design.

His father died in 1859, and he became aware that he would eventually need to return to the family farm to support his family. In January 1860 he began five month a tour of Europe with friends during which  they visited London, Paris, Florence, Rome, and Venice. He  married Agnes Higginson of Cambridge, Massachusetts in 1861 and brought her home  to the Deerfield farm. For the next fifteen years, he worked the farm and painted in his spare time in a studio converted form a carriage house. His farm failed in 1875, and he turned to painting for his livelihood.

In the spring of 1876, the opening of his first art exhibition relaunched his career as a painter.  In 1878  the National Academy exhibition included his Turkey Pasture in Kentucky and By the Wayside. The following year he sent to the Academy  And She Was a Witch and The Romany Girl.  He sent more pictures to the Academy in 1881 as his reputation and commercial success grew.

In 1878, Fuller showed the oil painting, Reapers Resting, as his first exhibited at the Boston Art Club.  Subsequently, at the Boston Art Club, he exhibited one oil painting, Head, in 1880; one oil painting, Portrait of Miss A___ in 1881; three oil paintings: Study Head, Portrait of Miss F., and Maidenhood, at the 1882 Boston Art Club exhibition; and the final oil painting he exhibited at the Club, Portrait of Miss C., was January 19–February 16, 1884.

His work continued to enjoy success until his death March 21, 1884, of pneumonia. A memorial exhibition of his works was held at the Boston Museum of the Fine Arts in 1884.

Examples of Fuller's artwork reside in the collection of the Museum of Fine Arts in Boston and the Metropolitan Museum of Art in New York.

Works
 Hannah, 1879, oil on canvas, The Nelson-Atkins Museum of Art, Kansas City, Missouri
 The Plains Between "The Bars" and South Deerfield, c. 1836-1838, oil on canvas, Addison Gallery of American Art, Andover, Massachusetts
 Cupid, 1854
 "The Birdcatcher", 1880, oil on canvas The University of Arizona Museum of Art, Tucson, Arizona
 Negro Nurse with Child, 1861
 At the Bars, 1865
 Ideal Head of a Boy (George Spencer Fuller)"", c. 1867–1873, oil on canvas, Metropolitan Museum of Art New York City
 By the Wayside, 1877, Museum of Fine Arts, Boston
 The Romany Girl, 1877-1879, oil on canvas, Addison Gallery of American Art, Andover, Massachusetts
 Shearing the Donkey, 1877-1879 
 And She Was a Witch, 1877–1884, oil on canvas, Metropolitan Museum of Art New York City
 Turkey Pasture in Kentucky, 1878
 The Dandelion Girl, 1879 
 The Quadroon, 1880, oil on canvas, Metropolitan Museum of Art New York City
 The Gathering of Simples, 1880
 Sketch of the Deerfield Valley, c. 1880-1884, chalk on blue-grey wove paper, Addison Gallery of American Art, Andover, Massachusetts
 Portrait of Mary C. Hardy as a Child, 1881, oil on canvas,  Addison Gallery of American Art, Andover, Massachusetts
 Winifred Dysart, 1881, Worcester Art Museum, Worcester, Massachusetts
 Hoeing Tobacco, Worcester Art Museum, Worcester, Massachusetts
 Nydia, 1882, oil on canvas, Metropolitan Museum of Art New York City
 Priscilla Fauntleroy, 1882
 Psyche, 1882
 November, 1882-1884 
 Fedalma, 1883-1884, oil on canvas, Smithsonian American Art Museum, Washington, D.C.
 Arethusa, 1884, Museum of Fine Arts, Boston 
 A Nun at Confession Boy and Bird Girl with a Calf Ideal Head, oil on canvas, Smithsonian American Art Museum, Washington, D.C.
 Reapers RestingNotes

References
 Downes, William Howe.  "George Fuller." Dictionary of American Biography Base Set. American Council of Learned Societies, 1928-1936.'' Reproduced in Biography Resource Center. Farmington Hills, Mich.: Gale, 2008. Online. February 18, 2008.

Attribution

External links
George Fuller Exhibition Catalogs from The Metropolitan Museum of Art 

19th Century Biographies

1822 births
1884 deaths
19th-century American painters
American male painters
Deaths from pneumonia in the United States
19th century in Boston
People from Deerfield, Massachusetts
Artists from Massachusetts
Deerfield Academy alumni
American portrait painters
19th-century American male artists